Autumnalia is a genus of flowering plants in the family Apiaceae. It is endemic to Uzbekistan.

Species
, Plants of the World Online accepted two species:
Autumnalia botschantzevii Pimenov
Autumnalia innopinata Pimenov

References

Apioideae
Apioideae genera